The first government of Ximo Puig was formed on 30 June 2015, following the latter's election as President of the Valencian Government by the Corts Valencianes on 25 June and his swearing-in on 28 June, as a result of the Socialist Party of the Valencian Country (PSPV–PSOE) and Commitment Coalition (Compromís) being able to muster a majority of seats in the Parliament with external support from We Can (Podemos) following the 2015 Valencian regional election.

The cabinet comprised members of the PSPV–PSOE and Compromís, as well as a number of independents proposed by both parties. It was automatically dismissed on 29 April 2019 as a consequence of the 2019 regional election, but remained in acting capacity until the next government was sworn in.

Investiture

Cabinet changes
Puig's first government saw a number of cabinet changes during its tenure:
On 7 June 2018, Universal Healthcare and Public Health minister Carmen Montón vacated her post in the cabinet in order to become Health minister in the new government of Prime Minister Pedro Sánchez following the 2018 vote of no confidence in the government of Mariano Rajoy. She was replaced in her post by Ana Barceló.

Council of Government
The Valencian Government was structured into the offices for the president, the vice president, nine ministries and the post of the secretary–spokesperson of the Government.

Departmental structure
Ximo Puig's second government was organised into several superior and governing units, whose number, powers and hierarchical structure varied depending on the ministerial department.

Notes

References

2015 establishments in the Valencian Community
2019 disestablishments in the Valencian Community
Cabinets established in 2015
Cabinets disestablished in 2019
Cabinets of the Valencian Community